7 is the second studio album by British pop group S Club 7. It was released by Polydor Records on 12 June 2000, and 14 November 2000 in North America. The album was primarily produced by Cathy Dennis and Simon Ellis. It became the group's most successful album release, and reached number one in the United Kingdom, where it was certified triple platinum. The album peaked at number sixty-nine on the Billboard 200 albums chart and was certified gold.

The album was re-released on 4 December 2000 to include S Club's 2000 Children in Need single "Never Had a Dream Come True". The re-release also included a previously unreleased cover of Stevie Wonder's "Lately", replaced the original album version of "Natural" with the radio edit, as well as including CD-ROM videos of both "Reach" and "Natural". The colour scheme of the album was changed slightly also, with more purple and lilac tones instead of blue.

Background
In February 2000, the group won the 'British Breakthrough Act' award at the 2000 BRIT Awards. In April 2000, S Club's second TV series, L.A. 7 (renamed S Club 7 in L.A. in the US), was released. The series saw the group depart from Miami and move to Los Angeles to seek a record deal. It introduced the song "Reach", another retro-styled uptempo track, which was co-written by Cathy Dennis and aired as the main theme tune to the second series. "Reach" was released as a single in May 2000 and reached number-two in the UK charts. It arguably became one of the group's most successful singles, paving the way for the group's second album, 7 which was released on 12 June 2000. This album was a departure from the overtly pop stylings of S Club, with several tracks styled more towards R&B and hip hop soul than the traditional nineties pop sound of their debut album. It reached number-one in the UK charts becoming certified Triple Platinum, and a certified Gold record in the US. The second single from the album, '"Natural", featured Stevens as lead vocalist. It reached number-three in September 2000.

S Club 7 took an active part in promoting several different charities during their time as a band. As well as performing for Children in Need, the band launched, on 25 September 2000, a new television series called S Club 7 Go Wild! which saw each band member support an endangered species. Teaming up with the World Wildlife Fund, each member travelled to different destinations worldwide with a hope to raise awareness about the seven endangered creatures, including the Siberian tiger and the hyacinth macaw. In October 2000, they launched the annual Poppy Appeal Campaign with Dame Thora Hird and supported Woolworth's Kids First Campaign throughout 1999 and 2000. The group also recorded vocals for "It's Only Rock 'N' Roll", which raised money for Children's Promise, an alliance of seven children's charities: Barnardo's, Children in Need, ChildLine, The Children's Society, Comic Relief, NCH and the NSPCC. A cover of The Rolling Stones song, the group contributed to the vocals alongside many popular artists, including Mary J. Blige, Natalie Imbruglia and the Spice Girls; it entered the UK charts at number-nineteen. Also during that time they filmed two specials: Artistic Differences and their Christmas Special.

In November 2000, S Club 7 were invited to provide the official song for the UK's BBC Children in Need Campaign 2000, so a new song, the ballad "Never Had a Dream Come True", was recorded. The song became popular in the US market eventually taking the group to appear on MTV's TRL to perform the song and chosen to appear at the "Now That's What I Call Music" US Edition. After topping the UK charts in December 2000, the song was added to a re-release of the 7 album, along with another new track, a cover of Stevie Wonder's "Lately". After the album's re-release, remixes by Solaris and Almighty were commissioned for 'Bring The House Down'. This, along with the song being a fan favourite, indicated that the song was to be released as the next single.  However, plans for this were scrapped and the band decided to focus on the next album. The almighty mix later received a commercial release on the 'You' single. "Spiritual Love" was originally recorded by Urban Species in 1994. The original version was used in TV ads of L'Oréal in the 1990s and in the movie Rainbow from 1996. "Stand By You" was originally performed by Danish duo S.O.A.P. in 1997. "Natural" is an adaptation of the song "Tous Les Maux D'Amour" by French singer Norma Ray. "Cross My Heart" was covered by Polish singer Edyta Górniak for her 2002 album Invisible. "Someday, Someway" is a cover of the original by Marshall Crenshaw.

Track listing

Charts

Weekly charts

Year-end charts

Certifications

References

S Club 7 albums
2000 albums
Polydor Records albums